The Three Cousins (French: Les trois cousines) is a 1947 French comedy film directed by Jacques Daniel-Norman and starring Rellys,  Andrex and Lysiane Rey. The film's sets were designed by the art director Robert Giordani.

Synopsis
A penniless engineer receives a large inheritance from his uncle in Brazil, on the condition that he marries one of his three cousins.

Cast
 Rellys	Césarin Malfait
 Andrex as Claude
 Lysiane Rey as 	Isabelle
 Marie Bizet as 	Sophie
 Jacqueline Roman as Joséphine
 Roland Armontel as 	Monsieur de Sainte-Lucie
 Marcelle Praince as 	Mme de Sainte-Lucie
 Joe Alex as 	Le Noir
 Marthe Sarbel as 	La princesse
 Gustave Gallet as 	Mitaine
 Hennery as 	L'infirmier
 Claude Rivory as Max
 Geno Ferny as Le notaire
 Julien Maffre as Le douanier
 Maria Cordoba as 	Conchita
 Pops as Un danseur acrobatique

References

Bibliography 
 Rège, Philippe . Encyclopedia of French Film Directors, Volume 1. Scarecrow Press, 2009.

External links 
 

1947 films
French comedy films
1947 comedy films
1940s French-language films
Films directed by Jacques Daniel-Norman
1940s French films